Morwood is a surname. Notable people with the surname include:

Mike Morwood (1950–2013), Australian archeologist
Paul Morwood (born 1959), former Australian rules footballer
Peter Morwood (born 1956) fantasy novelist and screenwriter
Phil Morwood (born 1982), Australian rugby league player
Shane Morwood (born 1961), former Australian rules footballer
Tony Morwood (born 1960), former Australian rules footballer